Honey Creek Township is one of eleven townships in Howard County, Indiana, United States. As of the 2010 census, its population was 2,109 and it contained 866 housing units.  The township is served by the Russiaville Post Office.

History
Honey Creek was organized in 1841 as a township in the northeastern corner of neighboring Clinton County.  The township's early population tended to be politically Republican, so the Republican party in Howard County and the Democrats in Clinton County collaborated to have Honey Creek Township removed from Clinton and added in 1850 to Howard.

Geography

The stream of Squirrel Creek runs through this township.

Cities and towns
 Russiaville

Adjacent townships
 Harrison Township (east)
 Prairie Township, Tipton County (southeast)
 Forest Township, Clinton County (southwest)
 Monroe Township (northwest)

Major highways

Schools
Western Intermediate School
Western Primary School

References
 
 United States Census Bureau cartographic boundary files

External links
 Indiana Township Association
 United Township Association of Indiana

Townships in Howard County, Indiana
Kokomo, Indiana metropolitan area
Townships in Indiana